Little Pancho Vanilla is a 1938 Warner Bros. Merrie Melodies cartoon directed by Frank Tashlin, with story by Tedd Pierce. The short was released on October 8, 1938.

Pancho is a Mexican boy, described by comics historian Don Markstein as "even more heavily stereotyped and lacking most of [Speedy Gonzales]'s particularly admirable attributes."

Despite only appearing in one cartoon, Pancho was resurrected in 1952 as a backup feature in the Looney Tunes and Merrie Melodies comic book, appearing from issue #130 (Aug 1952) to #154 (Aug 1954).

Plot 
Pancho, sighing over exciting tales of bullfighting, dreams of being a real toreador, even if his mother doesn't want him to fight bulls. He's spurred to show what he can do in the ring when three saucy senoritas whom he wants to impress cast their eyes at a poster of a handsome matador named Don Jose. The trio of girls with their colorful costumes show off their charms. However, Pancho is outclassed by other amateurs and by the bull. Pancho enters the amateur bullfight anyway and wins, thus realizing his dream.

Home media
Laserdisc - The Golden Age of Looney Tunes, Vol. 3, Side 6: Tashlin/Clampett
DVD - Looney Tunes Golden Collection: Volume 4, Disc 2

References

External links

Merrie Melodies short films
Warner Bros. Cartoons animated short films
Films scored by Carl Stalling
1938 films
1938 animated films
Short films directed by Frank Tashlin
1930s American films